Aker BioMarine is a Norwegian fishing and biotech company providing krill products through a fully documented and secured catch and process chain. Based in Oslo, Aker BioMarine is part of the Aker Group and the company also created Eco-Harvesting.

History
Aker BioMarine was established as an independent enterprise in 2006, building on years of deep-sea fishing experience as part of Norway‘s Aker Group. Its previous business activities were with the exception of the biotechnology company Natural, previously organized under Aker Seafoods Holding, a 100 percent subsidiary of Aker ASA. In 2003, Aker BioMarine began harvesting and processing Antarctic krill. Aker BioMarine claims to solve the problem of harvesting krill in both a commercially viable and environmentally sound way through its proprietary Aker ECO-Harvesting technology. The company re-listed on the Oslo Stock Exchange on July 6, 2020.

Technology and products
Aker BioMarine produces krill products rich in omega-3 phospholipids. Krill is mainly used for the production of krill meal and krill oil, which in turn is used for animal or aquaculture feed and for human consumption through health products and omega-3 supplements.

The company has registered Superba as the company’s brand name for nutraceuticals and Qrill as the company’s brand name for its krill meal and krill oil products for aquaculture.

As for research, a 2009 study of Superba krill oil found that it gave a substantially larger reduction of fat in the heart and the liver than omega-3 from fish oil. A clinical study in children with attention deficit hyperactive disorder (ADHD) suggests that Superba krill oil offered significant improvements in both clinical scores and in identified EEG patterns as compared to typical ADHD EEG patterns. In one study, krill-fed salmon acquired 11% greater body weight than that of the fish in the control group.
 
In 2011, krill oil was classified as generally recognized as safe (GRAS) for use as a human food ingredient. In one study, krill-fed salmon acquired 11% greater body weight than that of the fish in the control group.

The company uses eco-harvesting, a technology that brings live krill on board the boat and prevents the unnecessary by-catch such as birds and sea mammals. It also reduces the waste incurred by traditional methods when a proportion of the catch at the bottom of the net is rendered unusable through pressure from the rest as it is hauled aboard.

The Marine Stewardship Council (MSC) certified ECO-HARVESTING as sustainable on June 15, 2010. As of 2013, Aker BioMarine is the only krill fishery to achieve this distinction.

Awards and accomplishments
Aside from Superba receiving GRAS status and achieving MSC certification, the company received the "Investment in the Future Award 2012" from Nutrition Business Journal. Aker BioMarine received the award for "strategically investing more than $550 million to build out the krill supply chain in the Antarctic with a long-term focus on sustainable harvesting".

Memberships and associations
Aker BioMarine works closely with WWF-Norway and the Commission for the Conservation of Antarctic Marine Living Resources (CCAMLR) as well as independent scientists and marine conservationists to ensure that the company contributes to the well-being of the krill fishery and the Antarctic food chain. To that end, Aker BioMarine is a founding member of the Association of Responsible Krill harvesting companies (ARK), which works with CCAMLR to ensure a healthy and sustainable krill population in Antarctica.

References

External links

Aker ASA
Seafood companies of Norway
Companies based in Oslo
Food and drink companies established in 2006
Norwegian companies established in 2006
Fishing companies